Dry Rot is a 1956 British comedy film directed by Maurice Elvey, and starring Ronald Shiner, Brian Rix, Peggy Mount, and Sid James.

The story is an adaptation of a 1954 Whitehall farce by John Chapman, who also wrote the screenplay, in which the sketchy story plays second fiddle to the quick-paced action and unlikely situations. The plot concerns the practice of gambling, which was illegal in the United Kingdom at the time, other than at racecourses.

Plot
Three dodgy bookies, Alf Tubbe (Ronald Shiner), Flash Harry (Sidney James), and Fred Phipps (Brian Rix), plan to rig a horse race by kidnapping the fancied horse and its French jockey. They stay at a country house hotel near the racecourse, run by Colonel and Mrs Wagstaff, where they conceal the horse Sweet Lavender (and later the jockey) in a hidden cellar.

They substitute Fred for the real jockey, expecting him to lose, but this plan backfires when he wins.

A subplot sees the dimwitted Fred fall in love with the hotel chambermaid Beth (Joan Sims).

A final chase scene has the main characters on a fire engine being pursued by the police.

The title Dry Rot refers to the rotten wood on the hotel stairs, which regularly catches every character unawares.

Cast
 Ronald Shiner as Alf Tubbe
 Brian Rix as Fred Phipps
 Peggy Mount as Police Sergeant Fire
 Lee Patterson as Danby
 Sid James as Flash Harry
 Joan Sims as Beth Barton
 Heather Sears as Susan
 Michael Shepley as Colonel Wagstaff
 Joan Haythorne as Mrs. Wagstaff
 Miles Malleson as Yokel
 Christian Duvaleix as Polignac
 John Roy Chapman
 Joan Benham as Blonde
 Raymond Glendenning as himself
 Fred Griffiths as Bookie
 Wilfrid Brambell as Tar Man

Locations
The horse-racing sequences were filmed at Kempton Park Racecourse, Sunbury-on-Thames.

Critical reception
 The Radio Times critic wrote, "This tale of crooked bookies plods along more slowly than a doped horse, but there is the compensation of the polished performances of expert farceurs Ronald Shiner, Brian Rix, and Sid James."
Sky Movies wrote, "Heather Sears makes her screen debut, Joan Sims giggles infectiously, and the charms of Shirley Ann Field can be very briefly glimpsed as a waitress at the Three Frogs Cafe. But Peggy Mount sweeps all else before her in a relatively short, but devastating, appearance as the indomitable Sergeant Fire."

References

External links

1956 films
1956 comedy films
British comedy films
1950s English-language films
Films directed by Maurice Elvey
Films about gambling
British horse racing films
1950s British films
British black-and-white films